Bob Marley At His Best is a compilation album from reggae artist Bob Marley and The Wailers.  The album was released 30 March 1992 on the Special Music label.

Track listing 

 "Try Me" - 2:46
 "My Cup" - 3:09
 "Keep On Moving" - 3:00
 "Stand Alone" - 2:08
 "Mellow Mood" - 2:37
 "Soul Rebel" - 3:15
 "Rebel's Hop" - 2:30
 "The Sun Is Shining" - 2:08
 "Small Axe" - 3:35
 "Riding High" - 2:14
 "Lively Up Yourself" - 2:40
 "Soul Shakedown Party" - 2:50

Personnel 
The following personnel are credited with this album:

 James Brown - composer
 Bob Marley - composer, guitar, primary artist, vocals
 Bob Marley and The Wailers - primary artist
 Pair - record label
 Lee "Scratch" Perry - composer
 Cole Porter - composer
 Special Music Company - record label

References

External links 
Amazon.com Album Info

1992 albums
Bob Marley and the Wailers albums
Albums produced by Lee "Scratch" Perry